The Mersey River is a river on the north-west coast of Tasmania, Australia. The city of Devonport is situated at the river's mouth on Bass Strait.

The source of this river is Lake Meston.
From here the river feeds itself into Lake Youd.

Lees Creek is a tributary to the Mersey River and it feeds into Lake Orion, Lake Merope, Lake Eros, Lake Artemis and Junction Lake prior to the Mersey.

Feather Creek from Cathedral Mountain is a tributary to the Mersey River at this point.
Campfire Creek is the next tributary.

The Mersey flows into Lake Rowallan. The Rowallan Power Station, part of the Rowallan Dam is a hydro-electric station is also located on the Mersey.

Fish Creek is also a tributary to Lake Rowallan.

The Mersey then flows to Lake Parangana.

Lake Parangana also takes inflows from the Fisher River, this has a tributary of the little Fisher River and Fisher River flows through Lake MacKenzie and the Fisher Power Station which also has a tributary from Explorer Creek which is fed from Lake Explorer.

Water from Lake Parangana is transferred west via tunnels to Lemonthyme Power Station. The water runs into Lake Cethana.

The Mersey River continues to flow from Lake Parangana through Parangana Power Station and takes in Overflow Creek and Mole Creek as its tributaries.

Lobster Rivulet flows into the Mersey at the next point.

The Dasher River which has York Creek as a tributary flows joins with the Minnow River and then Dasher River flows into the Mersey.

Coilers Creek, Caroline Creek and Bonney's Creek are also tributaries.

Kings Creek which has a tributary from Latrobe Creek flow into the Mersey.

Ballahoo Creek, Snag Creek, Cockers Creek, Figure of Eight Creek and Horsehead Creek are next to contribute to the flow of the Mersey River.

The Mersey flows under the Victoria Bridge and through the Port and City of Devonport.

The Mersey river finally feeds itself into Bass Strait.

In the winter of 2016 the Mersey River had a major flood as a result of widespread heavy rainfall across Tasmania. The flood resulted in significant damage to bridges and other riverside infrastructure, as well as extensive erosion of the river bank and uprooting of trees, leading to numerous logjams in narrow gorges such as at Big Bend. These logjams were so extensive that the many kayakers who use the river were required to portage around them to travel downstream.

Recreation

The Mersey is a popular trout fishing stream holding brown and rainbow trout.

Each March long weekend is the Devonport Regatta which consists of Power Boat racing, Miss Regatta Girl, Trans Mersey Swim, greasy pole, side show alley and woodchopping events.

Whitewater rafting is popular on the river.

Latrobe's Henley-on-Mersey Regatta held on Australia Day 26 January each year at Belles Parade consists of woodchopping, Ferret racing, Triathlon, Iron Trial Strongman, Boat Race, Cherry Spitting and Gum boot throwing.

The Mersey River is also popular for water skiing.

See also

References

 
Devonport, Tasmania